Campanophyllum is a fungal genus in the family Cyphellaceae. The genus is monotypic, containing the single species Campanophyllum proboscideum, found in Costa Rica. The genus was circumscribed in 2003 to accommodate the species formerly known as Lentinus proboscoides.

See also
 List of Agaricales genera

References

 

Cyphellaceae
Fungi described in 2003
Fungi of Central America
Monotypic Agaricales genera
Taxa named by Ron Petersen